Roger Connell (born 8 September 1946) is an English former professional footballer who played as a forward in the Football League. He was capped twice for England Amateurs.

References

1946 births
Living people
People from Seaford, East Sussex
English footballers
England amateur international footballers
Association football forwards
Wimbledon F.C. players
Walton & Hersham F.C. players
English Football League players